Mandra is a small village 14 km west of Larissa, Greece. Inhabited by Misthiotes deriving from the Greek city of Misthi south of Caesarea (Kayseri).

Populated places in Larissa (regional unit)